Laika Come Home is a remix album by British virtual band Gorillaz, released in July 2002. Unlike a typical remix album, it is done by just one group, Spacemonkeyz. It contains most of the songs from Gorillaz' first album, Gorillaz, but remixed in dub and reggae style. The album features Terry Hall, U Brown, Earl Sixteen and 2-D. One single, "Lil' Dub Chefin'", was released from the album on 22 July 2002, with moderate success. The limited edition was packed in digipak, featuring two hidden tracks. In 2004, the album was packaged with 2001's Gorillaz in a box set as part of EMI's "2CD Originals" collection. The album's title is a reference to Laika, the Soviet space dog, and the film Lassie Come Home. The album contains mixes of every song on the original album except "Double Bass", "Latin Simone (¿Que Pasa Contigo?)", and "Rock the House".

Background
The Spacemonkeyz appear to be first referenced before the album in the "Tomorrow Comes Today" video. During the video, in the background, a poster can be seen with three pictures of monkeys with spacesuits and the caption "Laugh now but one day we'll be in charge". The artwork is a famous piece of artwork by Banksy, the visual artist who worked with Damon Albarn for Think Tank's artwork and Demon Days producer Danger Mouse in an attack against Paris Hilton. Before the release of the album, the mix of Tomorrow Comes Today (Bañana Baby) was released in the single of Tomorrow Comes Today in February 2002.

Track listing

Personnel

Musicians
Damon Albarn – vocals , piano , stylophone , melodica , guitar 
Spacemonkeyz – instrumentation, programming, guitar, bass, drum programming
Miho Hatori – additional vocals 
Tina Weymouth – additional vocals 
Michael Smith – horn, horn arrangements , flute 
Martin Shaw – horn 
Dan Left Hand – bass 
Jeff Scantlebury – percussion 
Jaques Shythé – castanets 
U Brown – vocals 
Dennis Rollins – horn 
Dominic Glover – horn 
Phil Soul – bass 
Earl Sixteen – vocals 
Stuart Zender – bass , clavinet 
Pete Collins – incendiary device 
Simon Katz – guitar , organ 
Brian Pisce – strings  
Terry Hall – vocals

Technical
Gorillaz – production
Tom Girling – co-production, engineering, Pro Tools
Jason Cox – co-production, engineering
Dan Nakamura – production 
Spacemonkeyz – additional production, re-mixing
Pete Collins – assistance

Artwork
J.C. Hewlett – illustration
Mat Wakeham – art direction
Kate McLauchlan – design
Roland Hamilton – monkey photos

Charts

Release details
The album was released in various countries in July 2002.

References

Gorillaz albums
Spacemonkeyz albums
2002 remix albums
Astralwerks remix albums
Parlophone remix albums
EMI Records remix albums
Virgin Records remix albums
Caroline Records remix albums
2002 debut albums
Albums produced by Damon Albarn
Albums produced by Dan the Automator